Burkey Belser is an American graphic designer. He is best known for his design of the Nutrition facts label, the U.S. Food and Drug Administration (FDA) mandated food labeling system that appears on all packaged foods in the United States, which has been called by some  "the most frequently reproduced graphic in the world." He is also widely known for the pioneering work in legal advertising that earned him a Lifetime Achievement Award from the Legal Marketing Association as well as induction into that organization's Hall of Fame.

Biography
He was born July 8, 1947 in Columbia, South Carolina. The Belser family has been long-established in the South, with Christian Belser (1752–1812) arriving in Charleston from Baden-Baden, Duchy of Württemberg in 1787.  A family plantation, Sunnyside on Edisto, South Carolina, has been exclusively in family hands from the Mikell side of the family for over 300 years.  Summer-long stays in the natural setting of the plantation awakened his artistic predilection.  He took painting and drawing courses at the University of South Carolina when he was eight. He redrew entire issues of The New Yorker cartoons before settling on favorite cartoonists such as William Steig and Charles Barsotti.

His parents divorced in 1953. Belser lived another two years in Columbia with his mother and sister before moving with them and his stepfather to Birmingham, Alabama, for a year, then on to Memphis, Tennessee, for his junior high and high school years. Belser was given the President's Award by the student body, an award given to the individual judged to have contributed most to the high school. He is an Eagle Scout and earned the God and Country award.

Belser was not trained in graphic design. He was an English major and an art minor at Davidson College in North Carolina (the school offered no graphic design courses).  During the decade following college, Belser trained himself to be a designer.

In 1992, he was contacted by David Aaron Kessler's staff at the FDA to help with the Nutrition Facts label because of his prior success designing the EnergyGuide that appears on all major appliances in the U.S. Because Congress had mandated the reformulation of the label but not its redesign, Belser undertook the project as a pro bono effort, for which he received a Presidential Design Award from President Bill Clinton. Massimo Vignelli called it a "masterpiece."  The success of that initiative led the FDA to once again call on Belser to design the Drug Facts label that now appears on all over-the-counter drugs.

On another vastly different design front, Belser began working with law firms shortly after the Bates v. State Bar of Arizona decision allowed lawyers to advertise. Over the next 30 years, the sustained body of work emanating from Greenfield/Belser Ltd., influenced countless others in their approach to law firm marketing.

Career
Belser held two jobs after college before beginning his career as a freelance designer.  After returning from a year at the University of Montpellier in southern France in 1969-1970, Belser joined the provocative magazine published by Ralph Ginzburg, Avant Garde, in New York City, ultimately becoming its circulation director.  After a year at the magazine, Belser left to travel from Istanbul to Kathmandu.  Upon returning, he settled in Washington, D.C. and became the business manager for The Righteous Apple, a graphic design studio created for the non-profit black cultural arts organization, New Thing Art & Architecture Center.  After 18 months, Belser left to build a freelance career. In 1978, he incorporated Burkey Belser, Inc, the same year he married Donna Greenfield who created Greenfield/Belser, Inc, a design consultancy focused on professional services. The businesses were merged in 1984 to create Greenfield/Belser Ltd.

Belser's first brochure for a law firm was designed in 1983 for the Virginia firm of McGuire Woods & Battle.  It was a 12-page hardcover book, modeled on 18th century book design.  The brochure took a Gold Award at the Art Directors Club of Washington, D.C., proving that design for law firms could be done in an instructive, informative and innovative manner. Belser quickly expanded the tactical and graphical legal vocabulary, creating the very first ads for a law firm, Howrey & Simon, in 1992.  He was also among the first to create a law firm logo, a "designed" law firm website, law firm newsletters and every other marketing tool that corporations use routinely today but that were simply unknown in the legal industry at that time.  The transformation of marketing in the legal industry was not unlike that of the banking industry in the 1970s and the accounting industry shortly thereafter—all of which had been for centuries either not permitted to "advertise" or bound by custom and decorum from doing so.

Publications
Belser authored 25 Years of Legal Branding (Sunnyside Press) published in 2004, a compilation of the Greenfield/Belser Ltd's work from 1979-2004.  His work also appears in other publications including: Absolutely the Newest Logos, Best of Corporate Identity Design, Big Book of Corporate Identity Designs (Watson-Guptill), Big Book of Design Ideas (Collins Design), Big Book of Letterhead and website Designs (Watson-Guptill), Global Corporate Identity, Global Graphics: Symbols (Rockport Publishing), HOW Colossal Design, Large Graphics (Rockport Publishing), The Newest Logos, Promotions that Work (Rockport Publishing), Small Graphics (Rockport Publishing),White Graphics (Rockport Publishing).

Awards
Belser was one of nine judges for the 2007 Communication Arts Design Annual, regarded by many as the nation's most prestigious graphic design competition. Since 1974, Belser has won hundreds of awards for his work in graphic design. Some of the competitions that have awarded him for his work include: AIGA 50, American Corporate Identity, Lifetime Achievement Award from the Art Directors Club of Metropolitan Washington, Communication Arts (Illustration Annual), Creativity magazine, American Graphic Design Awards (Graphic Design: USA), Graphis Inc., International Engraved Graphics Association, Legal Marketing Association Your Honor Awards, Logo 2000, 2002, Los Angeles Society of Illustrators, Print, Society for Marketing Professional Services, Webby Awards.

External links
Greenfield Belser Ltd
American Corporate Identity
Art Directors Club of Metropolitan Washington
Graphic Design: USA
Engraved Graphics Association
Legal Marketing Association
Los Angeles Society of Illustrators
Print magazine
Society for Marketing Professional Services
McGuire Woods & Battle
Howrey & Simon
Bates v. State Bar of Arizona
Energy Guide
Nutrition Facts
Drug Facts label

References

Living people
American graphic designers
1947 births
People from Columbia, South Carolina
People from Edisto Island, South Carolina